Frederick George Black (May 1, 1930 – September 17, 2007) was a Canadian football player who played for the Toronto Argonauts. He won the Grey Cup with Toronto in 1950 and 1952. Black previously attended and played football at St. Michael's College, Toronto. In November 2007 he was inducted into the Etobicoke Sports Hall of Fame. He died of cancer a few months prior on September 17, 2007.

References

1930 births
2007 deaths
Toronto Argonauts players
Sportspeople from Toronto
Players of Canadian football from Ontario